Carl M. Williams (born May 6, 1942) was a member of the State House of Representatives in the Michigan Legislature for three terms (2001–2007).

Prior to serving as state representative, Williams was elected to the Saginaw city council—an office which he held from November 11, 1991 until April 17, 2000. Saginaw's city charter prohibits currently serving members of the city council from seeking any other elective office. As a consequence, Williams resigned from the city council immediately prior to becoming a candidate for state representative. During his tenure as a city councilman, Williams was selected by the city council to serve as mayor pro tempore for two years.

Williams was first elected to the legislature in 2000 and subsequently re-elected in 2002 and 2004. Because of term limit provisions in the Michigan Constitution, he was ineligible to seek re-election in 2006.

He was a candidate for the Michigan Senate representing the 32nd District and prevailed over two other candidates, Dave Adams and Aaron Dodak, in the Democratic Party primary election on August 8, 2006. In the general election held on November 7, 2006, Williams was defeated by Republican Party candidate Roger Kahn, a representative from the 94th state house district.  It was the closest Michigan senate race that year, with Kahn winning by only 450 votes, or 0.48% of the vote, only after a recount.

As a member of the State House of Representatives, Williams served on the Appropriations Committee and its Subcommittees for General Government (for which he was minority party Vice Chairman), State Police/Military and Veterans Affairs (for which he was also minority party Vice Chairman), Natural Resources and Environmental Quality and School Aid and Department of Education.

Prior to his election to public office, Williams was employed by Delphi Steering Systems in Saginaw as an Employee Assistance Program Coordinator and manufacturing supervisor.

Williams and his wife Lavion have three children and live in Saginaw.

References

1942 births
Living people
African-American state legislators in Michigan
Members of the Michigan House of Representatives
Politicians from Saginaw, Michigan
Michigan city council members
20th-century American politicians
21st-century American politicians
20th-century African-American politicians
21st-century African-American politicians